Maciej "Maciek" Kuś (born 2 August 1982) is a Polish former competitive figure skater. He is the 2004–05 Polish national champion, and competed once at the  European Figure Skating Championships, where he placed 27th. He competed twice at the World Figure Skating Championships, placing 31st in 2003 and 34th in 2005. He was 23rd at the 2002 Junior Worlds and placed 16th at the 2005 Winter Universiade.

Kuś coaches skating at LIL Bergen in Norway. In August 2015, he helped coach at Glacier Skate International Training Academy in Whitefish, Montana.

Programs

Results
JGP: Junior Grand Prix

References

External links
 

1982 births
Living people
Polish male single skaters
People from Sosnowiec
Sportspeople from Silesian Voivodeship
Competitors at the 2005 Winter Universiade